Loch an Sgoltaire is an impounding reservoir located on the Inner Hebridean island of Colonsay, Scotland. The concrete dam was constructed in 1982 and is 3.1 metres high.

On one of the islands in the loch is a ruined castle similar to Loch Gorm Castle, Islay.

See also
List of reservoirs and dams in the United Kingdom

Citations

External links

ARGYLL AND BUTE COUNCIL RESERVOIRS ACT 1975 PUBLIC REGISTER

Sgoltaire
Colonsay
Sgoltaire